Ulakhan-Kyuel, also spelled as Ulakhan-Kyuyel or Ulakhan-Kyuyol (Улахан Кюель or Улахан-Кюёль; , Ulaxan Küöl) is a lake in the Sakha Republic (Yakutia), Russia.

It is the largest lake in Zhigansky District. The Ulakhan-Kyuel has a  protected area of regional significance that was established in 1994.

Geography
It is one of the largest lakes in the Central Yakut Plain. Flowing northwards from the lake at the northern end is river Ulakhan-Kyuyol-Seene (Улахан-Кюёль-Сээнэ), a tributary of river Seen-Yurekh, the largest tributary of the Natara.

Heading west, the Menkere, a tributary of the Lena, describes a wide, roughly semicircular, arch around the southern sector of the Ulakhan-Kyuel in its lower course.

See also
List of lakes of Russia

References

External links
ПРАВИТЕЛЬСТВО РЕСПУБЛИКИ САХА (ЯКУТИЯ)
Fishing & Tourism in Yakutia
Lakes of the Sakha Republic
Central Yakutian Lowland
Lena basin